The 2015 Summit League women's basketball tournament was a post-season women's basketball tournament for The Summit League. The tournament took place March 7–10 at the Denny Sanford Premier Center in Sioux Falls, South Dakota. The Top 8 teams in the final standings will qualify for the tournament. Omaha's transition into Division I basketball has deemed them ineligible from postseason play and instead of the top 8 teams qualify for the Summit League tournament it will be the 8 teams eligible for the tournament will play. South Dakota State defeated South Dakota to win the Summit League tournament title to receive an automatic bid into the 2015 NCAA tournament.

Seeds

Source:

Schedule

Bracket

Source:

References

Summit League women's basketball tournament
The Summit League women's basketball tournament